Steven David Daines (born August 20, 1962) is an American politician and former corporate executive who has served as the junior United States senator from Montana since 2015. A member of the Republican Party, he represented Montana's at-large congressional district in the U.S. House of Representatives from 2013 to 2015.

Before entering politics, Daines worked for the multinational corporation Procter & Gamble and the Montana-based software service RightNow Technologies. He was Roy Brown's running mate in the 2008 Montana gubernatorial election, losing in the general election to incumbent governor Brian Schweitzer. Daines ran again for public office in 2012 for Montana's at-large congressional district; he won the general election, defeating Democratic nominee Kim Gillan.

After incumbent U.S. Senator Max Baucus announced he would not run for reelection in the 2014 Senate election, Daines won the open seat, defeating Democrat Amanda Curtis and becoming the first Republican to win a Senate seat in Montana since 2000. He was reelected in 2020, defeating the Democratic nominee, incumbent governor Steve Bullock. In 2023, he became chairman of the National Republican Senatorial Committee.

Early life and education
Daines was born in the Van Nuys neighborhood of Los Angeles to Sharon R. and Clair W. Daines. The family moved to Montana in 1964. He was raised in Bozeman, where he attended school from kindergarten through college.

Daines graduated from Bozeman High School, where he served as student body president. He earned a Bachelor of Science degree in chemical engineering from Montana State University. At Montana State, he became a brother of the Sigma Nu fraternity.

Early career
Daines was one of the youngest delegates at the 1984 Republican National Convention. "I was a big fan of Ronald Reagan. He was the first president I got to vote for," he has said. Daines was also the president of MSU College Republicans. In 2007, he and his wife started a website, GiveItBack.com, which urged governor Brian Schweitzer to return the state's $1 billion surplus to taxpayers. From 2007 to 2008, he was Montana state chairman for the Mike Huckabee 2008 presidential campaign and a national surrogate for Huckabee.

Daines spent 13 years with Procter & Gamble. After seven years managing operations in the United States, he and his family moved to Hong Kong and China for six years, opening factories to expand Procter & Gamble's Asian business. During his 2014 Senate campaign, Democratic opponents alleged that Daines had outsourced U.S. jobs to China. He stated that he created hundreds of jobs in Montana when he worked for RightNow Technologies.

In 1997, Daines left Procter & Gamble to join the family construction business in Bozeman. Three years later, he met Greg Gianforte, founder of RightNow Technologies, and was put in charge of running RightNow's customer care division. Daines went on to become vice president of North America Sales and vice president of the Asia-Pacific division. During his tenure, the cloud-based software company became publicly traded and Bozeman's largest commercial employer. Daines remained with the company until March 2012, when he left to campaign for Congress full-time.

2008 gubernatorial election

Daines ran for lieutenant governor of Montana in 2008 with Roy Brown, the Republican nominee for governor. They challenged incumbent Democratic Governor Brian Schweitzer and his running mate John Bohlinger. Brown and Daines lost the election 65%–33%, winning only seven of Montana's 56 counties.

U.S. House of Representatives

2012 election

On November 13, 2010, Daines announced he would run for the U.S. Senate seat held by Jon Tester in 2012.

When U.S. Representative Denny Rehberg announced his intention to challenge Tester, Daines dropped out of the Senate race and announced his candidacy for the House seat Rehberg was vacating. He won the three-way Republican primary with 71% of the vote. In the general election, Daines defeated Democratic state senator Kim Gillan, 53%–43%. He won 48 of the state's 56 counties.

Committee assignments
 Committee on Homeland Security
 Subcommittee on Cybersecurity, Infrastructure Protection, and Security Technologies
 Subcommittee on Oversight, Investigations, and Management
 Committee on Natural Resources
 Subcommittee on Energy and Mineral Resources
 Subcommittee on Indian and Alaska Native Affairs
 Subcommittee on Public Lands and Environmental Regulation
 Committee on Transportation and Infrastructure
 Subcommittee on Aviation
 Subcommittee on Highways and Transit

Caucus memberships
 Congressional Western Caucus
 Congressional Rural Caucus
 Republican Study Committee
 NW Energy Caucus
 Congressional Sportsmen's Caucus
 Pro-Life Caucus

U.S. Senate

2014 election

In July 2013, Daines attended a NRSC fundraiser in Washington, prompting speculation that he would run for Max Baucus's soon to be vacant U.S. Senate seat. In the second quarter of 2013, he disclosed raising $415,000 in campaign funds, fueling more speculation. On November 6, 2013, Daines announced his candidacy.

In February 2014, Baucus resigned from the Senate to accept a post as U.S. ambassador to China. Governor Steve Bullock, a Democrat, appointed lieutenant governor John Walsh to the vacant Senate seat for the remainder of Baucus's term. Walsh had already declared his intention to run for the Senate in 2014, and it was suggested that his appointment might give him the advantage of incumbency, improving Democratic chances of holding the seat.

Daines won the Republican primary on June 3, 2014, with 83.4% of the vote against Missoula state representative Champ Edmunds and political newcomer Susan Cundiff. Walsh won the Democratic primary with 64% of the vote.

In August 2014, Walsh withdrew from the race following the publication of a New York Times article that accused him of plagiarism in a paper written as part of his master's degree work at the U.S. Army War College. With only 50 days until the election, a special convention called by the Montana Democratic party nominated State Representative Amanda Curtis.

Daines won the general election with 57.8% of the vote to Curtis's 40.1%.

2020 election

Daines was reelected in 2020, defeating Bullock with 55% of the vote. Democrats outspent Republicans by $19 million on the race, $82–63 million; it was one of the most expensive Senate races in the 2020 cycle.

Tenure

117th Congress (2021–present)
Before the 2021 United States Electoral College vote count, Daines said he would object to certifying the electoral count over unsubstantiated claims of voter fraud. He was participating in the certification when Trump supporters stormed the U.S. Capitol. During the attack, he tweeted "I condemn any kind of violence and intimidation. This is unacceptable." Daines changed his mind on objecting to the certification during the attack. He also called the attack "a sad day for our country" and said, "destruction and violence we saw at our Capitol today is an assault on our democracy, our Constitution and the rule of law, and must not be tolerated." He called for a peaceful transfer of power. The Billings Gazette electoral board called for Daines to apologize to Joe Biden for his role in opposing the certification. Daines rejected calls for Trump to resign or be impeached in the wake of the attack.

During the Biden administration, Daines sought to block Deb Haaland's nomination as Interior Secretary.

Committee assignments

Current
 Committee on Appropriations
 Subcommittee on Defense
 Subcommittee on Interior, Environment, and Related Agencies
 Subcommittee on State, Foreign Operations, and Related Programs
 United States Senate Appropriations Subcommittee on Transportation, Housing and Urban Development, and Related Agencies 
 United States Senate Appropriations Subcommittee on Financial Services and General Government 
 Committee on Energy and Natural Resources
 Subcommittee on Energy
 Subcommittee on Public Lands, Forests and Mining
 Committee on Finance
 Subcommittee on Energy, Natural Resources, and Infrastructure
 Subcommittee on Health Care
 Subcommittee on International Trade, Customs, and Global Competitiveness
 Committee on Indian Affairs
Previous
 Committee on Commerce, Science, and Transportation (2015–2017)
 Committee on Agriculture, Nutrition, and Forestry (2017–2019)
 Committee on Homeland Security and Governmental Affairs (2017–2019)

Political positions
Daines is considered politically conservative. The American Conservative Union's Center for Legislative Accountability gives him a lifetime rating of 84.79. The politically liberal Americans for Democratic Action gave him a score of 5% for 2019.

Abortion
Daines opposes legalized abortion except to protect the life of the mother.

Budget and taxes
Daines introduced his first bill, the Balanced Budget Accountability Act in February 2013. The bill would have required members of Congress to pass a budget that would balance in ten years or have their pay terminated. Daines supported the No Budget, No Pay Act of 2013, which would put members of Congress's salaries in an escrow account unless they passed a budget by April 15, 2013.

Daines has opposed an internet sales tax, which would allow states to collect taxes on online sales. He has called legislation to provide the authority "a job-killing tax hike that hurts American small businesses".

D.C. statehood
In June 2020, Daines argued against statehood for the District of Columbia, saying that most Americans oppose statehood for the U.S. capital and suggesting that members of Congress "get out of this city, go out to where the real people are at across our country and ask them what they think." Critics objected to his implication that D.C., a city of more than 705,000, nearly half of whom are Black, are not "real people". Further pressed, Daines explained that people outside the D.C. "bubble" oppose statehood, while those in D.C. support it.

Donald Trump
According to the Helena Independent Record, Daines had by 2020 "aggressively tied himself to Trump, both backing and defending the president over the last three years". During Trump's presidency, Daines voted with Trump's stated public policy positions 86% of the time.

In the 2018–2019 United States federal government shutdown, when Congress would not meet Trump's demand for $5.7 billion in federal funds for a U.S.–Mexico border wall, Daines voted for a bill that put $5.7 billion towards the border wall and against a bill that would have funded the government without putting resources toward a wall.

Daines voted to acquit Trump in his impeachment trial on charges of abuse of power and obstruction of Congress related to his request that Ukraine announce an investigation into Joe Biden. He said Trump had not committed a crime, that Democrats had "not done their complete homework", and that it was the most partisan impeachment trial in history. Daines said the purpose of the impeachment was to "[overturn] the election of 2016 and [try] to define the election of 2020". During the trial, he voted not to hear witnesses and to block the Senate from subpoenaing documents from the White House.

Daines was supportive of Trump's response to the COVID-19 pandemic.

In June 2020, amid protests against racism and police brutality in the wake of the murder of George Floyd, Daines defended Trump's decision to disperse protestors with a chemical irritant so that he could stage a photo op in front of St. John's Church, saying he was "grateful for the president's leadership".

In October 2020, during the lead-up to his reelection bid, Daines began to shift his rhetoric about Trump.

On January 2, 2021, Daines joined 11 other Republican senators in an attempt to overturn the presidential election results in Arizona and Pennsylvania. Trump and his allies made false claims of fraud in the election. Daines later withdrew his objection to counting the two states' electoral votes.

On May 28, 2021, Daines voted against creating an independent commission to investigate the 2021 United States Capitol attack.

Education
Daines has proposed abolishing the United States Department of Education and in 2019 co-authored the Academic Partnerships Lead Us to Success Act, to allow state and local governments to withdraw from federal education requirements.

Energy and environment
Daines rejects the scientific consensus on climate change. In 2019, he said, "to suggest that [climate change] human-caused is not a sound scientific conclusion."

Daines criticized President Barack Obama for his administration's positions on natural resource development, calling Obama's 2013 climate change proposal a "job killer" and a "war on American energy". He co-sponsored the Northern Route Approval Act, which would allow for congressional approval of the Keystone pipeline. Daines expressed strong support of Montana's coal industry and oil production in eastern Montana and the Bakken formation.

On June 5, 2013, Daines introduced the North Fork Watershed Protection Act of 2013, which would withdraw 430,000 acres of federal lands in Montana from programs to develop geothermal and mineral resources. The law would forbid mountaintop removal mining and other natural resource development. The affected lands lie adjacent to Glacier National Park and already have some protections. Daines emphasized his desire "to rise above partisan politics, preserve the pristine landscape, and 'protect this critical watershed'" when he announced that he would be introducing the bill, and said that both conservationists and energy companies supported it. The bill, also supported by Tester and Walsh, passed in the House, but Senate Republicans prevented it from being voted on.

Daines has called for litigation reforms to allow more logging in Montana's forests. In April 2016, he signed on to the Restoring Healthy Forests for Healthy Communities Act, legislation to address the expiration of the Secure Rural Schools program by renewing the federal government's commitment to manage forest resources.

In July 2019, Daines co-founded the Roosevelt Conservation Caucus, a group of Republican members of Congress meant to focus on environmental issues with specific priorities including reducing water and ocean plastic pollution, and heightening access to public lands and waters in the United States for outdoor recreation, hunting and fishing.

In February 2021, while Texas was suffering power outages amid a snowstorm, Daines tweeted, "This is a perfect example of the need for reliable energy sources like natural gas & coal" in a criticism of renewable energy such as wind turbines and solar energy. Failures in natural gas, coal, and nuclear energy systems caused nearly twice as much power outage as frozen wind turbines and solar panels, though wind power was reduced by a far higher percentage.

In November 2021, Daines criticized the Biden administration for stricter regulations of methane emissions from the oil and natural gas sector (which had signaled that it was open to the Biden administration's regulatory shift).

Foreign policy
Daines was a supporter of strong China-US relations, but became more critical of China during the COVID-19 pandemic.

In August 2017, Daines co-sponsored the Israel Anti-Boycott Act (s. 720), which made it a federal crime, punishable by a maximum of 20 years in prison, for Americans to encourage or participate in boycotts against Israel and Israeli settlements in the occupied Palestinian territories if protesting actions by the Israeli government.

In January 2019, Daines was one of 11 Republican senators to vote to advance legislation intended to block Trump's lifting of sanctions against three Russian companies.

In June 2019, Daines was one of eight senators to sign a letter to Premier of British Columbia John Horgan expressing concern over "the lack of oversight of Canadian mining projects near multiple transboundary rivers that originate in B.C. and flow into" Alaska, Idaho, Washington, and Montana. The senators requested that British Columbia replicate American efforts to protect watersheds.

In January 2020, Daines expressed support for the US military's assassination of Iranian major general Qasem Soleimani by drone strike at the Baghdad International Airport.

Gun policy
Daines opposes gun control legislation. He has signaled opposition to proposals for expanded background checks and red flag laws, saying he does not believe such legislation would reduce gun violence.

Health care
In 2017, Daines voted to repeal the Affordable Care Act (Obamacare).

Immigration
Daines opposes allowing Deferred Action for Childhood Arrivals (DACA) recipients to apply for temporary protection to stay in the United States; he believes the program is an executive overreach.

Daines supported Trump's 2017 executive order to impose a temporary ban on entry to the U.S. to citizens of seven Muslim-majority countries.

Internet and technology
Daines opposes net neutrality and praised its 2017 repeal by the Federal Communications Commission (FCC). In May 2018, he voted against legislation to overturn the FCC's ruling and restore net neutrality.

In May 2020, Daines and Ron Wyden co-sponsored an amendment that would have required federal law enforcement and intelligence agencies to obtain federal court warrants when collecting web search engine data from American citizens, nationals, or residents under the Foreign Intelligence Surveillance Act (FISA).

Judiciary
In May 2018, Daines announced his support for the so-called nuclear option "to speed up consideration of President Trump's judicial nominees". He has argued that changing the Senate's rules to a simple majority vote would "ensure a quicker pace on Trump's court picks".

In September 2020, after Justice Ruth Bader Ginsburg's death, Daines supported moving forward with Trump's nominee to fill the vacancy on the court before the November presidential election. He tweeted that he wanted to "protect our Montana way of life". In March 2016, after Justice Antonin Scalia's death, Daines said Obama's nominee to the Supreme Court should not be considered, as the "American people have already begun voting on who the next president will be" and Americans should "have their voices heard" via the 2016 election.

LGBT rights
Daines opposes same-sex marriage and said he was "disappointed" in the Supreme Court's decision that same-sex marriage bans are unconstitutional.

Personal life
Daines and his wife have four children. He enjoys mountain-climbing and has scaled Granite Peak and Grand Teton.

Daines is a Presbyterian.

Electoral history

References

External links

 U.S. Senator Steve Daines official U.S. Senate website
 Steve Daines for U.S. Senate
 
 

|-

|-

|-

|-

|-

|-

1962 births
Living people
21st-century American politicians
American people of Norwegian descent
Procter & Gamble people
Montana State University alumni
People from Van Nuys, Los Angeles
Politicians from Bozeman, Montana
Presbyterians from Montana
Republican Party members of the United States House of Representatives from Montana
Republican Party United States senators from Montana